Vistra is a Fortune 275 integrated retail electricity and power generation company based in Irving, Texas.

The company is the largest competitive power generator in the U.S. with a capacity of approximately 39GW powered by a diverse portfolio, including natural gas, nuclear, solar, and battery energy storage facilities.

In the 2020 Forbes Global 2000, Vistra Energy was ranked as the 756th-largest public company in the world.

The company owns the Moss Landing Power Plant in California which currently (2021) contains the largest battery energy storage system in the world (400-MW/1,600-MWh).

As of 2020, the company was the ranked as the highest CO2 emitter in the US.

History 

In 2016, Texas Competitive Electric Holdings (TCEH), parent company of TXU Energy and Luminant, emerged from Chapter 11 (as part of the bankruptcy protection for Energy Future Holdings Corporation). TCEH was then rebranded as Vistra Energy.

Vistra acquired Dynegy in 2018. In 2019, Ambit Energy was acquired, resulting in a 32% residential market share in ERCOT, with NRG Energy as its largest competitor. It also acquired Crius Energy in 2019.

References 

Companies based in Texas
Electric power companies of the United States
Companies listed on the New York Stock Exchange